The Potaro River is a river in Guyana that runs from Mount Ayanganna area of the Pakaraima Mountains for approximately  before flowing into the Essequibo River, Guyana's largest river. The renowned Kaieteur Falls is on the Potaro.

Features 
Nine waterfalls are found on the Potaro River, most notable being Kaieteur Falls and Tumatumari Falls. Below Kaieteur Falls lie Amatuk Falls and Waratuk Falls.

A 1930 Suspension bridge, the Garraway Stream Bridge crosses the river. As well, 'Two Islands' is found on the Potaro River.

Minerals 

Placer gold and diamonds are extracted from the river in this mineral-rich area. Many thousands of ounces of placer gold have been recovered from the area's stream gravels, residual placers and saprolites.

In the first half of the 20th century, small-scale artisanal miners, known as pork-knockers, recovered significant quantities of gem-quality diamonds from the area's rivers and streams. In fact, the two largest gem-quality diamonds recovered in Guyana to date – 56.75 carats (11.35 g) from Little Uewang River and 25.67 carats (5.134 g) from Maple Creek – were recovered in the Potaro area.

Illegal dredging is a constant issue, and the remoteness makes monitoring difficult.

The mineral Potarite is named for the river where it was first discovered by Sir John B. Harrison.

Settlements 

Villages along the Potaro include Micobie, Tumatumari, Chenapau (south of Kaieteur Falls), and Menzies Landing, a 20-minute walk upriver from Kaieteur Falls, is the main staging area for up river travel. Up river from the falls, the Potaro Plateau stretches out to the distant escarpment of the Pakaraima Mountains.

In the mid-1950s, the first hydropower plant was built at the Tumatumari falls by British Guiana Consolidated Goldfields Limited. Its purpose was to power the dredges of their gold mining operations, however a prolonged workers' strike led to closure. In 1976 the Guyana National Service put one of the turbines to use for supplying power to its administrative centre until 1987.

Potaro Landing 

The Potaro River is navigable up to Potaro Landing. Further upstream, rapids and waterfalls make travel by boat impossible. In 1933, the Denham Suspension Bridge opened near Potaro Landing to shorten the access to the gold fields of the interior. There was a daily steamer service from Tumatumari Landing to Potaro Landing to transport passenger and freight to the interior.

The population of Potaro Landing and surrounding area was 112 people in 2012. Potaro Landing is located at

See also
 Amaila Falls
 Kamarang Great Falls
 King George VI Falls

References 

Rivers of Guyana
Essequibo River